Wangenheimia  is a monotypic genus of plants in the grass family. The only known species is Wangenheimia lima,

Description
An annual ornamental grass, which bears unusual, feather-like or herringbone-shaped seedheads on long, wiry stems, all summer long.

Taxonomy

The genus is named after the Prussian botanist Friedrich Adam Julius von Wangenheim (1749–1800). The Latin specific epithet of lima refers to the Latin noun of file, often referring to a rough surface. Wangenheimia  was first described and published in Methodus on page 200 in 1794. The species was first published in Fund. Agrost. on page 132 in 1820.

The genus is not recognized by the United States Department of Agriculture and the Agricultural Research Service, listing it as a synonym of Festuca L. and they do not list any known species.

Distribution
It is native to Spain and Portugal (in Europe) and Morocco, Algeria and Tunisia (in North Africa). 

It is found in grasslands, 

Cultivation
It has been cultivated under the name Wangenheimia 'Lima Vulcan', Wangenheimia lima 'Vulcan', or Wangenheimia lima ‘Vulcan’ and “Vulcan Grass”.

References

Pooideae
Monotypic Poaceae genera
Plants described in 1794
Flora of Spain
Flora of Portugal
Flora of Morocco
Flora of Algeria
Flora of Tunisia